What Comes Next is the debut studio album by Australian electronic music duo Cosmo's Midnight, released on 15 June 2018. The album debuted at number 36 on the ARIA Charts. The album cover was illustrated by Charlotte Mei.

Track listing

Charts

References

2018 debut albums
Cosmo's Midnight albums
Albums produced by Cosmo's Midnight
Sony Music Australia albums